Jalon Daniels is an American football quarterback at the University of Kansas. He has been the starting quarterback for the Jayhawks since the end of the 2021 season.

High school career
Daniels attended Lawndale High School in Lawndale, California. He committed to the University of Kansas to play college football after previously committing to  Middle Tennessee State University. Daniels also received offers from Air Force, Army, Louisiana, and Syracuse, among others, with Kansas and Syracuse being the only Power Five conference schools.

College career

2020 season
Daniels started six games for the Jayhawks his freshman year. Kansas went 0–9 that season. He completed 76 of 152 passes for 718 yards and threw for one touchdown and four interceptions.

2021 season
Daniels lost out to Jason Bean for the starting quarterback position during camp. Following an injury to Bean in a November 6, game against Kansas State, Daniels filled in for Bean. He would start for the Jayhawks the remainder of the season. As the starter he defeated Texas for only the second time since 1938, and the first time ever in Austin. The victory over Texas also ended multiple losing streaks: 8 straight overall losses, 18 straight within the Big 12, 20 straight to FBS opponents, and 56 straight in road conference games. The Jayhawks offense improved drastically after he became the starter in 2021, going from averaging 15.1 points per game to averaging 37.7. Despite the 1–2 record in his 3 starts, the Jayhawks were competitive in all three games, losing the two games by a combined score of 9. He finished the season with 860 yards, 7 touchdowns, and three interceptions.

2022 season
After losing the starting job the previous season to Bean, Daniels earned the starting position entering his junior year. The Jayhawks 3–0 start was their best start since 2009. They also won their Big 12 conference opener for the first time since 2009. Daniels recorded five total touchdowns against Houston and 100 yards rushing. For his performance, he won multiple player of the week awards: Walter Camp Offensive Player of the Week, the Big 12 Offensive Player of the Week, and Manning Award Star of the Week. Kansas also received votes to be ranked for the first time since 2009. In the Jayhawks September 23, game against Duke, he threw for a career high in yards and passing touchdowns with 324 yards and 4 touchdowns. Following the performance, some sports writers called Daniels a candidate for the Heisman Trophy. After leading the Jayhawks to a 5-0 record and their first ranking in the AP Poll since 2009, Daniels suffered a shoulder injury against TCU in the sixth game of the season. The injury was initially reported as season ending, but Daniels denied the report. He would return for the Jayhawks November 19 game against Texas. Following the conclusion of the regular season, he was named 2nd team All-Big 12, despite missing four games due to his shoulder injury. In the Jayhawks 55–53 loss to Arkansas in the 2022 Liberty Bowl, Daniels set a program record for passing yards in a game with 544 yards. His performance was also a Liberty Bowl record.

Statistics

References

External links
Kansas Jayhawks bio
College stats

Living people
Players of American football from California
American football quarterbacks
Kansas Jayhawks football players

Year of birth missing (living people)